MGM Medical College and Hospital, Aurangabad is a full-fledged medical college in Aurangabad, Maharashtra, India. The college imparts the degree Bachelor of Medicine and Bachelor of Surgery (MBBS). It is recognised by the Medical Council of India. The hospital associated with the college is one of the largest in Aurangabad district.

Selection to the college is done on the basis of merit through the National Eligibility and Entrance Test. Yearly undergraduate student intake is 150.

References

External links 
https://www.mgmmcha.org/

Medical colleges in Maharashtra
Universities and colleges in Maharashtra
Educational institutions established in 1989
1989 establishments in Maharashtra